Sarah Duke  (born 28 October 1987 in Colorado Springs, Colorado, United States), is an international women's motorcycle trials rider.

Biography
Duke began riding trials in 2001.

In 2005, she was selected for the US Women's Trial des Nations team with Nicole Bradford and Louise Forsley to compete in Italy. The team finished in 9th place.

Duke finished the 2006 season with third place in the US NATC Women's Trials Championship behind the Canadian Gas-Gas rider Kerry Williams and the American Sherco rider Caroline Altman. With Forsley, Duke competed for the US Trial des Nations team in France, finishing 7th.

In 2007, Duke put together a string of top two finishes, including a win in Tennessee and a pair of wins in Ohio. This was enough to give her the runner-up position in the championship, with Williams again taking the title and Caroline Altman third. Now part of the established US Women's TDN team with Forsley, the pair traveled to the Isle of Man for the 2007 event, finishing in 6th position.

In 2008 and 2009, Duke was again the runner-up, this time behind Williams' sister, Christy Williams.

Duke was runner-up again in 2011 when she finished behind Caroline Allen and ahead of the third placed future champion Rachel Hassler. A trip to Italy for the Trial des Nations event with Allen and her longtime teammate Forsley resulted in a 7th-place finish.

NATC Trials Championship career

See also
 NATC Trials Championship
 FIM Trial World Championship

References 

1987 births
Living people
Sportspeople from Colorado Springs, Colorado
American sportswomen
American motorcycle racers
Motorcycle trials riders
Female motorcycle racers
21st-century American women